Calcivertellinae is a subfamily of foraminifera belonging to the order Miliolida. Calcivertellids have been found in Pennsylvanian to Triassic beds and had a cosmopolitan distribution.

The calcivertellids are characterized by a porcelain-like test consisting of a single tube, initially forming a spiral but opening out into a zigzag shape. They live attached to a surface or to other organisms.

References

Tubothalamea